This article contains a list of fossil-bearing stratigraphic units in the state of Oklahoma, U.S.

Sites

See also

 Paleontology in Oklahoma

References

 
 List of Formations in the National Geologic Map Database

Oklahoma
Stratigraphic units
Stratigraphy of Oklahoma
Oklahoma geography-related lists
United States geology-related lists